Oskar Ernst Bernhardt, also known as Abd-ru-shin or Abdruschin (18 April 1875 – 6 December 1941), is best known as the author of the Grail Message.

After a brief commercial training Oskar Ernst Bernhardt began his literary activity while still a young man. Some of his literary works included "The Bracelet", "Annita", "The Adventurer", and "Diamonds". Some of his works would later preview the ideas he would publish in the Grail Message. For example, "Diamonds" is a comedy featuring a bet in which the main character must tell the truth for twenty-four hours, in order to win one million dollars. The plot highlighted the hypocrisy of everyday social life. While traveling, he was often led to foreign countries. In 1915 he was interned in Great Britain. Released in 1919, he first went to Dresden, later to Bavaria and in 1923 began to write the first lectures of the Grail Message.

In 1928 he settled in Vomperberg, Tyrol. There he wrote "In the Light of Truth: The Grail Message". In 1936, Abd-ru-shin was arrested "because of infractions of currency laws". The Nazis indeed arrested Abd-ru-shin in 1936 on the grounds of illegal foreign exchange from Germany to Austria. It turns out that this operation was carried out in absentia, over  his head, by two leaders of the Community. Therefore, he was unaware of anything and much less gave his consent to this action. Records confirm that Abd-ru-shin had given an express order to his collaborators, that they should always strictly follow all legal requirements. Abd-ru-shin got arrested on that occasion without knowing anything about what was happening. Months later he was declared innocent, and he was released. The settlement ended when the Nazis got angry at him. Many of his former members were also angry with him. In 1938, Abd-ru-shin was arrested after Austria came under German occupation.

The Messiah 

He claimed to be the Messiah or Son of Man. By his own admission, he was described in leading newspapers as the Messiah of the Tyrol and the Prophet of Vomperberg.

Certain strands of the Grail Movement consider Abd-ru-shin's wife Maria and her daughter divine as well.

Life, publishing, legacy

Bernhardt was born in Bischofswerda, Germany, trained in business, and successfully established himself in Dresden. He traveled and wrote travel books, stories, and plays. He resided in New York and London. He was in London when World War I broke out and in 1914 he was interned on the Isle of Man.

This seclusion gave him time to reflect, question, and deepen his understanding.  He was released in the Spring of 1919 and returned to Germany. He began to write In the Light of Truth: The Grail Message in 1923 and completed it in 1931 under the pen name Abd-ru-shin.

In 1928 he settled in Austria, Tyrol on a mountain plateau called Vomperberg. Here he continued writing The Grail Message. The Nazis came to power in 1938, ending his work there. He was arrested and exiled to Kipsdorf in the Erzgebirge. He was forbidden any further writing. He died while in Gestapo custody.

Legacy
After the war, his family returned to Vomperberg and carried on his work. Other writings by Abd-ru-shin published by Grail Foundation Press include The Ten Commandments of God and The Lord's Prayer, Questions and Answers, and Prayers.

References

Bibliography 

 Kurt Hutten: Seher - Grübler - Enthusiasten. 1997, S. 531–549
 Helmut Obst: Apostel und Propheten der Neuzeit – Gründer christlicher Religionsgemeinschaften des 19. und 20. Jahrhunderts. 4., stark erweiterte und aktualisierte Auflage. Vandenhoeck & Ruprecht, Göttingen 2000, 
 Andreas Plagge: "Bernhardt, Oskar Ernst". In: Biographisch-Bibliographisches Kirchenlexikon (BBKL). Band 22, Bautz, Nordhausen 2003, Sp. 120–122, .
 Georg Schmid: Kirchen, Sekten, Religionen. 2003, S. 219–221
 Lothar Gassmann: Zukunft, Zeit, Zeichen. Aufruf zur Wachsamkaeit, Verlag für Reformatorische Erneurung, Kaiserstr.78, D-42329 Wuppertal, 103 Seiten, .
 Patrick Diemling: Neuoffenbarungen Religionswissenschaftliche Perspektiven auf Texte und Medien des 19. und 20. Jahrhunderts, Universitätsverlag Potsdam, 2012, .

See also 

 Messiah complex

External links
 Abd-ru-shin, Author of the Work: In the Light of Truth, The Grail Message 
 Abd-ru-shin: In the Light of Truth, Grail Message
 1920-1941: The history of the origin and development of Abd-ru-shin and his main work "In the Light of Truth"
 Abd-ru-shin: The Ten Commandments of God - Explained to Mankind by Abd-ru-shin
 Abd-ru-shin: The Lord's Prayer - Explained to Mankind by Abd-ru-shin
 Ordem do Graal na Terra (in English)
 Grail Message (1931)

1875 births
1941 deaths
Cult leaders
People from Bischofswerda
People from the Kingdom of Saxony
German male writers
Writers from Saxony
Self-declared messiahs
Founders of new religious movements
Religious writers
20th-century apocalypticists